Sivar (also Romanized as Sīvar, Seyvar, and Sīwar; also known as Sevar) is a village in Gol-e Cheydar Rural District, Sarshiv District, Marivan County, Kurdistan Province, Iran. At the 2006 census, its population was 123, in 32 families. The village is populated by Kurds.

References 

Towns and villages in Marivan County
Kurdish settlements in Kurdistan Province